José Mario Anthony Torres (born 27 August 1972) is a Panamanian former football defender. He is currently manager of Sporting San Miguelito.

Club career
Nicknamed Chalate, Torres has had a lengthy career abroad playing for Honduran sides like Platense and Arsenal Roatán. He left Platense after seven years for Real España in summer 2003.

In January 2004 he left Real España after he refused to take up Honduran citizenship which the club asked him to bypass the foreign player quota. He then joined fellow Panamanian Donaldo González at Marathón and he moved to Iran to play alongside compatriot Carlos Rivera with local giants Persepolis.

In January 2007, Torres returned to Honduras to play for Victoria after an unsuccessful spell with Persepolis. Later he played in Guatemala for second division sides Deportivo Sanarate F.C. and C.D. Guastatoya. He returned to Panama in January 2010 after 14 years abroad when signed by Sporting San Miguelito.

International career
Torres made his debut for Panama in an October 1999 friendly match against Trinidad and Tobago and has earned a total of 75 caps, scoring no goals. He represented his country in 23 FIFA World Cup qualification matches and was a member of the 2005 CONCACAF Gold Cup team, who finished second in the tournament and he also played at the 2009 CONCACAF Gold Cup.

His final international was a June 2009 friendly match against Haiti.

Honours and awards

Club
C.D. Platense
Liga Nacional de Fútbol Profesional de Honduras (1): 2000–01
Honduran Cup (2): 1996, 1997

C.D. Marathón
Liga Nacional de Fútbol Profesional de Honduras (1): 2004–05

Managerial career
Anthony Torres was appointed manager of Sporting San Miguelito in September 2012 and immediately won the club's first league title in 2013.

References

External links

1972 births
Living people
Panamanian footballers
Panamanian expatriate footballers
Platense F.C. players
Real C.D. España players
C.D. Marathón players
Persepolis F.C. players
C.D. Victoria players
Sporting San Miguelito players
Panama international footballers
2001 UNCAF Nations Cup players
2003 UNCAF Nations Cup players
2005 UNCAF Nations Cup players
2005 CONCACAF Gold Cup players
2007 UNCAF Nations Cup players
2009 UNCAF Nations Cup players
2009 CONCACAF Gold Cup players
Copa Centroamericana-winning players
Expatriate footballers in Honduras
Liga Nacional de Fútbol Profesional de Honduras players
Expatriate footballers in Iran
Expatriate footballers in Guatemala
Panamanian football managers
Association football defenders